Need-blind admission is a term used in the United States denoting a college admission policy in which an institution does not consider an applicant's financial situation when deciding admission. This policy generally increases the proportion of admitted students needing financial aid and often requires the institution to back the policy with an ample endowment or other sources of funding. Being need-blind is a statutory requirement for institutions to participate in an antitrust exemption granted by Congress which remains in effect until September 30, 2022. An institution may be need-blind in any given year by policy (de jure) or by circumstances (de facto).

Most colleges and universities cannot afford to offer adequate financial aid to all admitted students; some are not need-blind while others admit students on a need-blind basis but do not offer them sufficient aid to meet their full demonstrated financial need. In addition, many schools that admit domestic first-year students without regard to need do not extend this policy to international or transfer students. Schools that are need-blind and meet full need for all applicants are usually very selective as they tend to receive more applications than other schools.

Institutions set their own definition of meeting the full demonstrated need. There is no universal standard that an institution must abide by to claim that it meets full demonstrated need. Additionally, some institutions meet full demonstrated need entirely through grants, merit scholarships, and/or talent scholarships, whereas others include loans that need to be repaid and/or work-study directly at the college campus in addition to the other forms of financial aid. For these reasons, an admitted student's financial aid package can vary significantly at different schools that all claim to meet full demonstrated need.

U.S. institutions that are need-blind and meet full demonstrated need for both U.S. and international students
There are currently seven U.S. higher education institutions that are need-blind towards all applicants. These institutions meet full demonstrated need for all applicants, including international students. These are:
Amherst College
Bowdoin College
Dartmouth College
Harvard University 
Massachusetts Institute of Technology
Princeton University
Yale University

U.S. institutions that are need-blind for U.S. applicants and meet full demonstrated need for certain or all students
A number of U.S. institutions of higher learning both offer need-blind admissions and meet the full demonstrated need for all students but are need-aware when it comes to international student admissions. However, all admitted students will have their demonstrated need met, although in some colleges, primarily public colleges, such aid may only be offered for students who either require financial aid or are under specific geographical demographics. For instance, College of William & Mary and University of Michigan are public research universities that meet the full need of qualifying in-state students (residents of Virginia and Michigan, respectively) but don't meet the full need of out-of-state or international students. The following schools fall into this category:

Antioch College (only students who qualify for the Pell Grant have the full need met)
Babson College (need-blind for Canadian students as well)
Barnard College (need-aware for transfer students) 
Berea College (tuition-free for all students; need-based aid, family EFC, and work-study will cover other costs)
Boston College
Bowdoin College (need-aware for transfer students)
Brandeis University (need-aware for transfer and waitlisted students)
Brown University (need-aware for transfer students)
California Institute of Technology
Carnegie Mellon University
Claremont McKenna College
College of William & Mary (only in-state students have the full need met; out-of-state students get only up to 25% of the cost covered)
Columbia University
Cornell University
Davidson College
Denison University
Duke University
Elon University (Odyssey Scholars only)
Emory University (may not meet full need for international students)
Georgia Institute of Technology (typically, only low-income in-state students have the full need met; entering freshmen from specific counties of South Carolina, Florida, North Carolina, or Tennessee who demonstrate financial need and are therefore qualified and selected for the Godbold Family Foundation Scholarship will also have 100% of their financial need covered)
Georgetown University ( need-blind for all students but doesn't guarantee meeting full need for international students)
Grinnell College
Hamilton College (need-aware for transfer students)
Harvey Mudd College 
Johns Hopkins University
Lehigh University (need-aware for waitlisted students)
List College
Middlebury College (need-aware for transfer students and wait-listed students)
Northwestern University (does not offer financial aid to international transfer applicants who are not U.S. citizens or eligible non-citizens)
Olin College
Pomona College
Purdue University (21st Century Scholars who are below an income level only)
Rice University
Soka University of America
Stanford University
Swarthmore College
Tulane University (only in-state first-year students below an income threshold have the full need met)
University of California, Los Angeles (only in-state students have the full need met; out-of-state students don’t receive financial aid)
University of Chicago
University of Delaware (only in-state students have the full need met)
University of Florida (only in-state students have the full need met)
University of Georgia (through HOPE and other scholarships)
University of Michigan (need-blind for in-state students only; only in-state students have the full need met)
University of North Carolina at Chapel Hill
University of Notre Dame
University of Pennsylvania (need-blind for Mexican and Canadian students as well)
University of Richmond (need-aware for transfer students)
University of Southern California
University of Virginia
University of Wisconsin - Madison (only in-state students who qualify for the Pell Grant have the full need met)
Vanderbilt University (need-aware for waitlisted students)
Vassar College (need-aware for transfer students)
Wake Forest University
Washington University in St. Louis (need-aware for transfer students)
Wellesley College
Williams College

U.S. institutions that are not need-blind for U.S. applicants and meet full demonstrated need for certain or all students
Many reputable institutions that once championed need-blind policies have modified their policies due to rising costs as well as subpar endowment returns. Such institutions include prestigious colleges that do not offer merit-based aid but promise to meet 100% of financial need (mostly through grants). These stated institutions refer to themselves as "need-aware" or "need-sensitive," with policies that detract from their ability to admit and educate all qualified candidates but allow them to meet the full need of all admitted students who qualify for financial aid (many institutions extend this policy to all students).

For instance, at Macalester College, Mount Holyoke College and Smith College, at least 95% of students are admitted without financial need being a factor, but a slim percentage, generally students who are waitlisted or who have borderline qualifications, are reviewed in consideration of the college's projected financial resources. All three colleges grant all admitted students financial aid packages meeting 100% of need. At Wesleyan University, attempted shifts to a "need-aware" admission policy have resulted in protests by the school's student body.

Some institutions only meet the full need for students who are domestic US residents and/or are eligible for US federal financial aid, as proven by the applicant's FAFSA and CSS profile. A few only meet the full need of students under specific demographics who are considered "economically disadvantaged" and may not be guaranteed to meet the full need of other students. Do note that some colleges don't state their financial aid admissions policy, so they're sorted into the need-aware category. The following schools fall into this category:

Alma College (Detroit high school students only)
American University (may not meet full need for transfer students)
Aquinas College (3.4 GPA and an SAT score of 1100 or ACT equivalent or higher required)
Augustana College (Illinois)
Bard College (only for historically economically disadvantaged in-state first-year students)
Bates College
Boston University (may not meet full need for international students) 
Bryn Mawr College
California State University, Long Beach
Carleton College
Case Western Reserve University
Colby College
Colgate University
College of the Holy Cross
Colorado College
Connecticut College
DePauw University (in-state students seeking financial aid only)
Dickinson College
Franklin and Marshall College
George Washington University (lower-income first-year students of the District of Columbia who qualify for the  D.C. Tuition Assistance Grant only)
Gettysburg College (select academically excelling, underrepresented minority, first-generation, first-year students only as part of the Gettysburg College STEM Scholars program)
Haverford College
Hendrix College (3.6 GPA and an ACT score of 26 or higher or an SAT score of 1230 or higher required)
Hobart and William Smith Colleges (early decision applicants only)
Kenyon College
Lafayette College
Lawrence University (Currently meets demonstrated need for students of Wisconsin and Illinois for Fall 2023 onward; possibly aims to soon extend a full need policy to all students)
Macalester College
Mount Holyoke College
National University of Natural Medicine
Northeastern University (may not meet full need for international students)
Oberlin College
Occidental College
Ohio State University (only in-state students who qualify for the Pell Grant have the full need met)
Ohio Wesleyan University (Charles Thomas Scholars only)
Pitzer College
Reed College
Saint Joseph's University (select underrepresented students only as part of the STEM^2 Scholarship Program)
Sewanee: The University of the South
Scripps College
Skidmore College
Smith College
St. Olaf College
Thomas Aquinas College
Stonehill College (Cathedral High School (Boston) graduates only) 
Trinity College
Trinity University (only for San Antonio Independent School District students)
Tufts University
Union College
University of Miami
University of Pittsburgh (Pittsburgh public high school valedictorians and salutatorians as part of the Pittsburgh Public Scholars program only)
University of Puget Sound (Tacoma public high school students only)
University of Rochester
Washington & Jefferson College (only in-state students who are eligible for the Pennsylvania State Grant, and have a 3.7+ GPA plus an SAT score of 1200 or an ACT score of 27)
Washington & Lee University
Wesleyan University
Worcester Polytechnic Institute (Worcester public high school students eligible for the Pell Grant as part of the Great Minds/Compass Scholars Program only)

U.S. institutions that are need-blind for U.S. applicants and don't guarantee meeting full demonstrated need
Some schools have a need-blind admissions policy but do not guarantee to meet the full demonstrated financial need of any of the students they admit. The following schools fall under this category:

Baylor University (meets 65% of need on average)
Bucknell University (meets 91% of need on average)
Cooper Union (all admitted students receive a half-tuition scholarship)
Fordham University
Hampshire College
Hillsdale College
Ithaca College
New York University (meets 60% of need on average)
Providence College
Saint Louis University
Salem College
Santa Clara University
Southern Methodist University (meets 85% of need on average)
St. John's College (Annapolis/Santa Fe) 
St. John's University
St. Lawrence University
Syracuse University (meets 93% of need on average)
Texas Christian University (meets 66% of need on average)
Juilliard School
University of San Diego (meets 71% of need on average)

U.S. institutions that are need-aware and don't guarantee meeting full demonstrated need
The following institutions are need-aware and aren't guaranteed to meet the full need of the students they admit in any capacity:

Abilene Christian University
Agnes Scott College
Allegheny College
Auburn University
Beloit College
Bennington College
Bentley University
Berklee College of Music
Berry College
Bradley University
The Catholic University of America
Centre College
Clark University
Clemson University
College of Wooster
Creighton University
DePaul University
Drexel University
Earlham College
Emerson College
Fairfield University
Furman University
Hampton University
Hofstra University
Howard University
Johnson & Wales University
Knox College
Lewis & Clark College
Loma Linda University
Loyola Marymount University
Loyola University New Orleans
Loyola University Chicago
Marquette University
The New School
Pepperdine University
Providence College
Quinnipiac University
Rensselaer Polytechnic Institute
Rhode Island School of Design
Rhodes College (meets 93% of need on average)
Rochester Institute of Technology
Rollins College
Sarah Lawrence College
Seton Hall University
Southwestern University
Spelman College
University of Dayton
University of Denver
University of San Francisco
University of California, San Diego
University of St. Thomas
University of Tulsa
Villanova University (plans on meeting full demonstrated need by 2030)
Wabash College
Wheaton College
Whitman College (meets 93% of need on average)
Willamette University
Wofford College

Non-U.S. institutions that are need-blind for all applicants
New York University Abu Dhabi, United Arab Emirates
Northwestern University in Qatar
Georgetown University in Qatar
Yale-NUS College, Singapore (formerly)

High schools
As of 2020, Phillips Academy, St. Albans School, St. Andrew's School and Wayland Academy are the only American boarding high schools that have clearly stated need-blind admission policies and meet the full demonstrated need of their admitted students. Phillips Exeter Academy was "effectively need-blind" prior to the 2009 admission season but stopped the practice because of economic pressures. Roxbury Latin School, a day school in the West Roxbury neighborhood of Boston, is also need-blind.

See also
 568 Group, an association of colleges practicing need-blind admission
 College admissions in the United States
 Transfer admissions in the United States

References

Student financial aid
University and college admissions